Provincial council may refer to:

Government
 Provincial councils of Sri Lanka, government bodies for the nine provinces of Sri Lanka
 Greenland Provincial Council, former local government bodies in Greenland
 Provincial Council (Italy), municipal legislative bodies in Italy
 Provincial Councils of New Zealand, former governing bodies of the Provinces of New Zealand (1853–1876)
 Provincial council (South Africa), a former governing body of each of the four South African provinces (1910–1986)
 Provincial council (Spain), governing body for a Spanish province
 Sangguniang Panlalawigan (literally "provincial council"; known in English as Provincial Board), legislatures of the provinces in the Philippines
 Taiwan Provincial Council, also known as Taiwan Provincial Consultative Council, defunct government body in Taiwan

Other
 Provincial council (Gaelic games), a body within Gaelic games which consists of several counties
 Provincial councils in Catholicism, a local ecclesiastical synod